Raimund Pigneter was an Italian luger who competed in the late 1970s and early 1980s. A natural track luger, he won the gold medal in the men's doubles event at the 1980 FIL World Luge Natural Track Championships in Passeier, Italy.

Pigneter also won two medals in the men's doubles event at the FIL European Luge Natural Track Championships with a gold in 1985 and a silver in 1983.

He is the father of Patrick who competes in natural track luge.

References
Natural track European Championships results 1970-2006.
Natural track World Championships results: 1979-2007
FIL-Luge.org October 6, 2008 article on the FIL World Luge Natural Track Championships 2009 mentioning Raimund and Patrick Pigneter. - accessed October 7, 2008.

Italian lugers
Italian male lugers
Living people
Year of birth missing (living people)
Sportspeople from Südtirol